Prospect High School (PHS) is a public high school in Saratoga, California, United States. It is part of the Campbell Union High School District.

Academics
Prospect offers a mix of advanced and on-level classes. Its curricula are continually evaluated and modified to reflect the needs of students and to assure that all students are challenged and supported in their academic growth. For the college bound student, Prospect offers numerous honors and Advanced Placement classes and meets California State University and University of California requirements soundly. Vocational and technical coursework is offered through the elective program on campus and the Central County Occupational Center. In addition, the Special Education and English Language Development programs foster the spirit of full inclusion through mainstreaming and Specially Designed Academic Instruction in English (SDAIE) classes—other student support services include AVID, The after school homework center, Math and English Workshops, Reading Intervention, and Title I. Recently, Prospect switched to an Integrated Math system compliant to Common Core standards. 45.5% percent of Prospect's graduating class of 2020 report that they will enroll in a two or four-year college or university.

In 2011, Prospect became the first school in the Campbell Union High School District to adopt Naviance, bolstering the campus College and Career Center with this guidance software. In addition to this, Prospect offers a varied curriculum, offering nine Advanced Placement and eighteen total Honors-level courses. Unique to Prospect is the Astronomy class, made possible by the easily recognized dome telescope; the Mandarin class, new for the 2012–13 school year and only offered at Prospect within CUHSD, the Accounting class in the Applied Arts department; and the Advancement Via Individual Determination (AVID) program. Connections to West Valley College via the Middle College and College Advantage programs give college-bound high school students a jump on college admissions and credits.

Athletics 
In addition to academic excellence, Prospect places a large emphasis on its many athletic programs. A member of the Blossom Valley Athletic League, Prospect's teams and individual athletes frequently advance to the Central Coast Section championships.
 1979 Varsity Softball defeated Hillsdale High School 5-1 for Prospect's first CCS title.
 1982 Varsity Baseball team won first CCS men's title in school history by defeating Westmont (8-7).
 1983-1986 100m breaststroker Jennifer Hau won the CCS championship four times consecutively with times of 1:07.43, 1:03.30, 1:02.66, and 1:03.89.
 1985 100m backstroke swimmer Dave Meck won the CCS Individual Championship with a time of 52.72.
 1988 Varsity Football team won WVAL division title by being undefeated (9-0). They lost in the quarterfinals of the CCS Div 1-3A playoffs to Wilcox High (25-6).
 1988 Varsity swimmer Joyce Murphy won the CCS 100m freestyle championship with a time of 52.12. 
 1990 Varsity Badminton player Janelle Yamasaki won the Girls Singles CCS Championship.
 1992 Men's Varsity Soccer team was declared CCS co-champion with Monta Vista after a scoreless game lasting 110 minutes.
 1997 Varsity Football team won BVAL division title by being undefeated (9-0-1)).
 2003 Track and Field individual athlete Ferman Smith won first place in the CCS high jump finals, leaping six feet, six and a half inches to advance to the CIF state championships.
 2009 Men's Varsity Soccer team won CCS title in OT (3-2) by scoring three unanswered goals to overcome 2-0 halftime deficit against Terra Nova.
 2009 Varsity wrestler Shohei Takagi wins the 135-lb CCS title.
 2010 Men's Tennis team tied for the Santa Teresa division of the BVAL.
 2011 The Field Hockey team were league champions in the West Valley Division of BVAL.
 2011 Varsity Football team won Homecoming in double OT against San Jose High Academy (42-41) after erasing eight-point deficit in final minute of regulation.
 2012 Track and Field individual athlete Kamara Biawogi won first place in the 110m hurdles CCS Finals with a time of 14.42, advancing to the CIF state championships.
 2012 Varsity Softball team was co-league champions in the Santa Teresa division of BVAL.
 2012 Men's Swimming 300m Freestyle CCS Individual Championship, John Lee, with a time of 7:59.39
 2012 Men's Volleyball went undefeated in its league, winning the BVAL's Santa Teresa Division and advancing to the CCS Championships as the 10th overall seed.
 2014 Men's Tennis team was co-league champions of the Santa Teresa division of the BVAL.
 2014 Men's Swimming 100m Freestyle CCS Individual Championship, Arm Albakay, with a time of 2:43.32 
 2014 and 2015 Women's Track and Field named BVAL champs.
 2015 Men's 4x4 team wins BVAL, goes to CCS and makes CCS top 8 as the youngest team at the meet
 2015 Cross Country women's varsity team and individual male athlete Danny Rubino advance to CIF state championships.
 2016 Varsity Badminton player Leonard Thang won the Boys Singles CCS Championship.
 2016 Women's Track and Field athlete Olga Baryshnikova: BVAL High Jump champion, 3rd place at CCS with 3-way tie at 5'7" and advanced to CIF state meet.
 2016 Men's Varsity Soccer won CCS co-championship
 2019 Cross Country individual male athlete Elliot Daniels places 2nd in CCS Division 3 and advances to CIF state meet
 2019 Men's Varsity Soccer won CCS championship, advanced to CIF state semifinal
 2021 Varsity Football team wins the BVAL West Valley league championship after defeating Del Mar and finishing an undefeated 5-0 season

Campus 
Prospect has a relatively small campus at the base of the Santa Cruz Mountains. Spanning twenty-nine acres and 14 buildings, Prospect serves 1,550 students with an average class size of 32 students. The original construction began in what was originally a cherry orchard in 1966, the campus opening in September 1968 for the 1968–1969 school year.  Since 2005, district bonds from Measure C and state funds have renovated most of the campus, most notably:
 In 2005, the $4.3 million science wing was completed. Designed with energy efficiency and advanced laboratories in mind, the building has automated radiant heating, an artistic sundial in the courtyard, and a robotically controlled fiberglass dome telescope.
 In 2006, the A-wing (English), B-wing (Administrative Facilities), and C-wing (Math and Social Sciences) were renovated.
 In 2007, the L-wing and the library were renovated. The library, while small, features a technology center, student art showcases, extensive collections and databases, and plenty of study space and natural light. 
 In 2008, the main gymnasium was renovated. The baseball and softball fields were updated, and the two remaining fields were replaced with low-maintenance, beautiful synthetic turf fields.
 In 2010, the locker rooms and gymnasium lobby were renovated. Also, in 2010, the Panther mascot painted on the front of the school was updated to look more like a panther and less like a "beaver", as it was affectionately called.
 In 2011, the new Performing Arts center was completed. The main quad was landscaped.
 In 2012, both parking lots were redone. Solar panels were added to provide shade and renewable energy for students and faculty.
 In 2015, Johnson Field House and cooking facilities were finished with a separate building for bathrooms and general maintenance.
In the 2016–2017 school year, the F-wing was renovated for a large video production classroom, complete with a studio and control room. The studio was finally completed in September 2018.
In 2018, the Campbell Union High School District implemented fences surrounding all of its high school campuses, including Prospect.

The cafeteria and remaining wings (art, music, and CTE) are scheduled for renovation as well. In the 2016–2017 school year, it was announced that Prospect would add a new two-story STEM building to its campus. The tennis courts were removed in spring of 2018 and were replaced by August 2018 in the back field. Construction began on the STEM building in the fall of 2018. The STEM building is set to open in August 2022 in time for the 2022–23 school year.

Other
 Associative Student Body (ASB) - The school's official student government. 
 Astronomy Club – Prospect High School is the only high school in the Bay Area with a working observatory
 Mock Trial – The school Mock Trial team won its first Santa Clara County Championship in 2006, when it defeated Palo Alto High School. In 2011, the Mock Trial team defeated Saratoga High School to again win the County championship.  In 2012, the team went undefeated in the county tournament, to repeat as county champions. The team was County Champion both in 2015 and 2019; and earned the school's 6th County Championship in 2022.
 In 2014, the Prospect Debate Team was ranked 27th in the nation for Parliamentary debate. In 2017, it rose to 9th in the nation.
 Prospect eSports Nation (PeSN)

Notable alumni
 Grant Geissman, (Class of 1971), American jazz guitarist
 John Meehan, criminal who was the subject of the 'Dirty John' Los Angeles Times series, a podcast, and a TV show, mid 70s
 Wayne Koestenbaum, (Class of 1976), American poet and cultural critic
 Steve Harwell (Class of 1985), lead singer of Smash Mouth
 Jon Nakamatsu (class of 1986), concert pianist
 Gordy Carbone (Class of 1993), singer and radio host
 Stephanie Lostimolo (Class of 1998), digital artist

See also
 Santa Clara County high schools

References

External links
 

Campbell Union High School District
Saratoga, California
High schools in Santa Clara County, California
Public high schools in California
Educational institutions established in 1968
1968 establishments in California